Theophano Martinakia (866/67 – 10 November 897) was a Byzantine empress by marriage to Leo VI the Wise. She is venerated as a saint by the Eastern Orthodox Church.

Family 
Her family, the Martinakioi, were related to the Amorian dynasty, which ruled the Byzantine Empire from 820 to 867. Theophanes Continuatus, a continuation of the chronicle of Theophanes the Confessor by writers active during the reign of Constantine VII, records the story of a possible ancestor during the reign of Theophilos (reigned 829–842).

According to said story, there was an elder Martinakios related by marriage to Theophilos. A prophecy circulated at the time predicted that the family of Martinakios would come to rule the Byzantine Empire. In reaction Theophilos forced his kinsman to become a monk and convert his personal house into a monastery.

Christian Settipani has suggested the Martinakioi family could share common ancestry with the Phrygian Dynasty, allowing descendants some claim to the throne. He has suggested the relation may be through one of the sisters of dynasty founder Michael II. The origins of the dynasty are poorly recorded.

Empress 
The chronicle of Symeon Metaphrastes places the marriage of Leo VI and Theophano in the sixteenth year of the reign of Basil I (c. 883). Basil was the official father of Leo VI by Eudokia Ingerina. However Eudokia was the mistress of his predecessor Michael III who was suspected to be the natural father of the prince.

In any case the marriage was arranged by Basil I and forced on Leo VI. The poor relation of father and son may have played a part in the eventual failure of this marriage. Basil died on 29 August, 886. Leo succeeded him to the throne and Theophano became his empress.

She was an educated and deeply religious woman. According to the Byzantine tradition of hagiography about her, Theophano devoted most of her days to prayers, psalms and hymns to God. She was reportedly the builder or patron of the Monastery of Saint Anastasia the Protector from Potions (Hagia Anastasia Pharmacolytria) in Chalkidiki.

Symeon records Leo falling in love with Zoe Zaoutzaina in the third year of his reign, placing their meeting c. 889. Zoe became his mistress and replaced Theophano in his affections.

Monastic life 

In the seventh year of his reign (c. 893), Theophano retired to a monastery in the Blachernae suburb of Constantinople. Theophano is considered particularly devoted to the church throughout her life. Whether her retirement was voluntary is left vague by both Theophanes and Symeon. Zoe replaced her in the palace and court life.

There is a contradiction on her particular status from c. 893 to 897. According to Symeon, the marriage of Leo VI to Theophano was officially void, allowing Leo and Zoe to marry within the year. According to Theophanes, the original marriage was still valid and Zoe remained the imperial mistress.

Death and canonization
Theophano died in her monastery on 10 November, between 893 and 897. According to Theophanes, Leo and Zoe proceeded to marry at this point. Both Symeon and Theophanes agree that Zoe was only crowned Augusta following the death of her predecessor.

Theophano was glorified (canonized a saint) by the Eastern Orthodox Church following her death. Her feast day is 16 December of the Eastern Orthodox Church calendar. After her death, her husband built a church, intending to dedicate it to her. When he was forbidden to do so, he decided to dedicate it to "All Saints," so that if his wife were in fact one of the righteous, she would also be honored whenever its feast day was celebrated. According to tradition, it was Leo who expanded the celebration on the Sunday following Pentecost from a commemoration of All Martyrs to a general commemoration of All Saints, whether martyrs or not.

Children 
According to De Ceremoniis by Constantine VII, Leo VI and Theophano only had one daughter, Eudokia, considered to have died young. Eudokia was buried in the Church of the Holy Apostles along with her father and mother.

References

Sources

External links
 in Charles Cawley's "Medlands"
Listing and brief biography among other Orthodox saints by the Dailyreadings Listserver of the Greek Orthodox Archiochese of America

860s births
897 deaths
Macedonian dynasty
Byzantine saints of the Eastern Orthodox Church
Eastern Orthodox royal saints
9th-century Byzantine empresses
Burials at the Church of the Holy Apostles
9th-century Christian saints